Joseph-Jean Lagarde, Baron of the First French Empire, (11 May 1755 – 9 July 1839), was an avocat, a magistrate and a French civil servant.

He was a member of the Etats généraux de 1789.

Biography 
Advocate in the Flanders parliament since 1776, he was named substitute adviser and prosecutor for the king on the royal domicile of the mastery in Lille on the 31 October 1781, guard consultant in the same seat (domicile) transitional on the 4 February 1782 and consultant in the royal seat (domicile) of bailiwick in Lille on the 30 January 1788. An intermission in the parliament of Flanders admitted him the practice of this office on the following 22 February, with exemption to exercise.

References
 
 
↑   A. Lievyns, Jean Maurice Verdot, Pierre Bégat, p. 530.
↑  A. Jay, E. Jouy, Antoine-Vincent Arnault, p. 295-302.
↑   Jacques Logie, Les Magistrats des cours et des tribunaux en Belgique, 1794–1814, Librairie Droz, 1998, 513 pages, p. 161 [archive], note 302.

1755 births
1839 deaths
French civil servants
French magistrates
18th-century French judges